John Wright Yarwood (21 Sept 1891–1964) was an English footballer who played for Rochdale when they joined the English Football League in 1921.

References

Rochdale A.F.C. players
Merthyr Town F.C. players
English footballers
1891 births
1964 deaths
Footballers from Stockport
Association footballers not categorized by position